The following is a list of programs broadcast by A2Z, a Philippine free-to-air broadcasting television network serving as a flagship property of ZOE Broadcasting Network in partnership with ABS-CBN Corporation through a blocktime agreement. A2Z carries selected ABS-CBN programs from Kapamilya Channel and its sister channels, as well as some feature contents from ZOE TV's sister station Light TV and its content partners including CBN Asia and Trinity Broadcasting Network, similar to its previous airtime lease with GMA/Citynet.

For the previously aired shows of the network, see the list of programs aired by A2Z (Philippine TV channel) and the list of ABS-CBN drama series.

Current original programs 
Note: Titles are listed in alphabetical order, followed by the year of debut in parentheses.

Locally-produced programs 
Newscast
 Balitang A2Z 
 Ulat A2Z

ABS-CBN-produced programs 
All programs are broadcast or simulcast on Kapamilya Channel and streaming on Kapamilya Online Live, while other programs are also broadcast on TV5.

News and current affairs
 News Patrol 
 TV Patrol 
 TV Patrol Weekend 
 KBYN: Kaagapay ng Bayan 

Drama
 A Soldier's Heart 
 Ang sa Iyo Ay Akin 
 Be Careful with My Heart 
 Dirty Linen 
 FPJ's Batang Quiapo 
 Ipaglaban Mo! 
 The Iron Heart 

Animated
 Hero City Kids Force 

Weekly Series
 Beach Bros 

Variety
 ASAP Natin 'To 
 It's Showtime 

Children's show
 Parent Experiment 
 MusiKantahan 
 Team Yey! 

Educational
 Alikabuk 
 ATBP: Awit, Titik at Bilang na Pambata 
 Epol/Apple 
 Hiraya Manawari 
 K-High 
 MathDali 
 Math-Tinik 
 Pamana 
 Payong K-Lusugan 
 Ready, Set, Read! 
 Salam 
 Sine'skwela 
 Wikaharian 
 Wow! 

Game
 I Can See Your Voice 

Talk
 Magandang Buhay 

Reality
 The Voice Kids 

Comedy
 Goin' Bulilit

Light TV-produced programs 
 Bro. Eddie Villanueva Classics 
 Diyos at Bayan 
 Jesus the Healer 
 JIL Live Worship and Healing Service 
 Shuffle: Honoring God Through Music

Current acquired programs 
Note: Titles are listed in alphabetical order, followed by the year of debut in parentheses.

Anime series 
 Naruto Shippuden (season 10) 
 Remi, Nobody's Girl 
 The Flying House

Cartoons 
 Masha and the Bear 

 Robocar Poli 
 Superbook Reimagined

Variety 
 Tropang LOL

Current affairs 
 Rated Korina

Film presentation 
 Afternoon Zinema 
 FPJ: Da King 
 Zine Aksyon 
 Zinema sa Umaga

Foreign drama 
 The Great Show

See also
 List of programs distributed by ABS-CBN
 List of programs broadcast by ABS-CBN
 List of programs broadcast by Kapamilya Channel
 List of programs aired by Light TV (past Main ZOE TV programming)
 List of programs aired by ZOE TV (past Channel 11 programming)
 List of programs broadcast by Light TV

References

ZOE Broadcasting Network
A2Z (Philippine TV channel) original programming
Lists of television series by network
Philippine television-related lists